Hollywood Don't Surf! is a 2011 documentary film that premiered in the 2010 Cannes Film Festival while a work in progress and held its North American premiere at the 2011 Telluride Film Festival, where it was presented to a packed park at the Abel Gance Outdoor theater by actress Daryl Hannah.

Narrated by Robert Englund, the film explores the purportedly strained relationship between Hollywood film makers and the surfing community. After an irreverent and wild main title sequence (including the first printed and filmed images of surfing), Hollywood Don't Surf! examines the legendary film Gidget and the subsequent surf exploitation genre that followed, centering on the ambitious John Milius written and directed 1978 Warner Bros. film Big Wednesday, a commercial disappointment at the time, and the smattering of surf films that followed as Big Wednesday enjoyed a subsequent rebirth as a cult film on home video.

The documentary features:
 Quentin Tarantino
 Steven Spielberg
 John Milius
 Jan-Michael Vincent
 Robert Englund
 Stacy Peralta
 Gary Busey
 Lee Purcell
 Frankie Avalon
 John Stockwell
 Nia Peeples
 William Katt
 Laird Hamilton
 Greg Noll
 Kathy Kohner-Zuckerman
 Rick Dano
 Holly Beck

References

External links
 

2011 films
American sports documentary films
2011 documentary films
Films directed by Greg MacGillivray
Documentary films about surfing
MacGillivray Freeman Films films
American surfing films
2010s English-language films
2010s American films